Rathcormack  was a constituency represented in the Irish House of Commons from 1611 to 1800. It was a mix of potwalloping and a Manor Borough established by charter and remained tied to the borough and surrounding area. The franchise was vested in the £5 and until 1793, Protestant freeholders and after 1782 a year's residence was necessary. It was disenfranchised on the 1 January 1801 on the coming into force of the Acts of Union 1800 and compensation of £15,000 was paid to the representatives of the Tonson family.

Borough
This constituency was the borough of Rathcormack in County Cork. After its establishment in 1611 it had a sovereign, 12 burgesses and freemen.

Members of Parliament

Notes

See also
Rathcormack, a town in County Cork
Irish House of Commons
List of Irish constituencies

References
Johnston-Liik, E. M. (2002). History of the Irish Parliament, 1692 – 1800, Publisher: Ulster Historical Foundation (28 Feb 2002),
T. W. Moody, F. X. Martin, F. J. Byrne, A New History of Ireland 1534-1691, Oxford University Press, 1978
Tim Cadogan and Jeremiah Falvey, A Biographical Dictionary of Cork, 2006, Four Courts Press 

Constituencies of the Parliament of Ireland (pre-1801)
Historic constituencies in County Cork
1611 establishments in Ireland
1800 disestablishments in Ireland
Constituencies established in 1611
Constituencies disestablished in 1800